Kick Ass: Music from the Motion Picture is the soundtrack to the film of the same name. It was released in the United Kingdom on 29 March 2010, and in the United States on iTunes on 30 March 2010. The title song is sung by Mika, co-written by Jodi Marr and produced by RedOne.

The video for the single shows Mika as a helpless individual left in an alleyway after being mugged. He begins to sing and as he does, the words of empowerment in the lyrics and his finding of an issue of the Kick-Ass comic inspire him to run for the rooftops and wail the chorus to the sky. The video also features intercut scenes from the film.

The song "Stand Up" by The Prodigy is featured in both the teaser trailer and the red band trailer.

A song featured in the film, but not on the soundtrack is "Crazy", by Gnarls Barkley. This song is played in the Mistmobile while Kick-Ass and Red Mist cruise around town together. Also, the version of "Bad Reputation" used in the film was by Joan Jett but the version on the soundtrack is by a band called "The Hit Girls".

The song "Hey Little World" by The Hives, which played in the theatrical trailers was also not included.

Track listing

The Score

The film's score was released on 17 May 2010 in the UK.
Two of the instrumentals in the film are frequently compared to songs from other John Murphy composed soundtracks. These are "In The House, In A Heartbeat" from 28 Days Later: The Soundtrack Album and "Adagio in D-minor" from the Sunshine soundtrack. The former was used in the scene where Big Daddy guns down D'Amico's men in the warehouse and the latter was used when Hit-Girl is trying to rescue Kick-Ass and Big Daddy. They are called "Big Daddy Kills" and "Strobe (Adagio in D Minor)" respectively on the Kick-Ass score. One track, "Walk To Rasul's" was composed by Danny Elfman, who was referenced in the original comic.

Track listing

References

2010 albums
Kick-Ass (franchise)
Superhero film soundtracks